

Current microphone manufacturers
The following is a list of current microphone manufacturers.

Akai
AKG
Astatic
Audio-Technica
Behringer 
Beyerdynamic
Blue Microphones
Brauner
Brüel & Kjær
CAD Audio
Core Sound LLC
DJI
DPA
Earthworks
Electro-Voice
Fostex
Gauge Precision Instruments
Gentex Corp
Georg Neumann GmbH
Grundig
Heil Sound
JZ Microphones
Lauten Audio
Line 6
Manley Laboratories
M-Audio
Microtech Gefell
Milab
MIPRO
Nady Systems, Inc.
Nevaton
NTi Audio
Oktava
PCB Piezotronics
Peavey Electronics
Philips
Røde Microphones
Royer Labs
Schoeps
Sennheiser
Shure
Sony
TASCAM/TEAC Corporation
TOA Corp.
Teza Sounds
Zoom Corporation

Defunct microphone manufacturers
The following is a list of defunct microphone manufacturers with articles.

Aiwa
Altec Lansing
American Microphone
Ampex
Astatic
Brush Development Company
Dynaco
Lafayette
Motorola
Philco
RCA
Realistic
Reslosound
Voice of Music
Webster-Chicago
Western Electric
Westinghouse

References

 
Lists of consumer electronics manufacturers
Technology-related lists